Nazar (The Gaze) is a 1991 Hindi-language film based on Fyodor Dostoevsky's 1876 short story, "The Meek One". The film produced by the National Film Development Corporation of India (NFDC) was directed by Mani Kaul and starred his daughter Shambhavi Kaul with Shekhar Kapur and Surekha Sikri.

The film travelled to international festivals like the Birmingham Film Festival in UK, Fribourg Film Festival in Germany, Hong Kong International Film Festival, Lisbon Film Festival in Portugal, Locarno Film Festival in Switzerland, London Film Festival in UK, Rotterdam Film Festival in Netherlands, Festival des 3 Continents at Nantes in France and the Seattle Film Festival in United States.

Storyline
A dealer lives in a spacious flat in a multi-storied building in Mumbai with his aunt. Though middle-aged himself, he marries a 17-year-old orphan girl and brings her home. The film starts off with the young wife committing suicide. He recollects what went before that and what might have moved her to end her life.

Cast
 Shekhar Kapur
 Shambhavi Kaul
 Surekha Sikri
 Asha Dandavate
 Parvez Merchant
 A.A. Baig

References

External links 
 

1991 films
Films directed by Mani Kaul
1990s Hindi-language films
Films based on short fiction
Films based on works by Fyodor Dostoyevsky